Media in Miami, Florida, United States, includes newspapers, magazines, Internet-based web sites, radio, television, and cinema. Florida produces some of its own media, while some comes from outside the state for Floridian consumption.

Print

The Miami Metropolis newspaper began publication in May 1896, overseen initially by W.S. Graham and Wesley M. Featherby, and later by B.B. Tatum. In 1934, it became the Miami Daily News. The Herald newspaper began in 1899, followed by the Central News and Miami Weekly in 1920. Tropic Magazine began in 1914.

The first Miami Book Fair was held in 1984.

Radio

The earliest radio stations in Miami were WQAM (est. 1921)
WNBW (est. 1975) and WIOD (est. 1926).

Television

In terms of media marketing in the U.S., Miami has the 16th largest television audience.

Love and Hip Hop: Miami was aired on January 1 on VH1.

See also
 Florida#Media
 Fort Lauderdale, Florida#Media and culture
 Gainesville, Florida#Media
 Media in Jacksonville, Florida
 Media in Key West, Florida
 Lakeland, Florida#Media
 Orlando, Florida#Media
 St. Petersburg, Florida#Media
 Tallahassee, Florida#Media
 Media in the Tampa Bay Area
 List of municipalities in Florida
 :Category:Spanish-language mass media in Florida

References

Bibliography
 
 
  
 
 Nixon Smiley. Knights of the Fourth Estate: The Story of the Miami Herald. E.A. Seemann Publishing, 1974.
 Roy M. Fisher. The Trial of the First Amendment: Miami Herald vs. Tornillo. Freedom of Information Center, 1975.
 
 Nixon Smiley. The Miami Herald Front Pages, 1903–1983. H.N. Abrams, 1983.
 
 Edna Buchanan. The Corpse Had a Familiar Face: Covering Miami, America's Hottest Beat. Random House, 1987.
 
 
 
 Martin Merzer, ed. The Miami Herald Report: Democracy Held Hostage. St. Martin's Press, 2001.
 
 
  
 Aurora Wallace. Newspapers and the Making of Modern America: A History. Greenwood Press, 2005. (Chapter 5: Florida in Chains: The Miami Herald and the Tampa Tribune)

External links

  (Directory ceased in 2017)

Images

 
Miami